Ajmer State was a separate state within India from 1950 to 1956 with Ajmer as its capital. Ajmer State was formed in 1950 out of the territory of former province of Ajmer-Merwara, which became a province of the Indian Union on 15 August 1947. It formed an enclave within the state of Rajasthan.  Following the States Reorganisation Act in 1956 it was merged with Rajasthan.

History

Ajmer State was formed out of territory of Ajmer-Merwara, which was a British controlled province during British India. The territory of Ajmer-Merwara had been purchased by British from the Marathas in 1818. Upon the independence of India, Ajmer-Merwara became a province of the Union of India.

It was a Province until it was established as a Class "C" State, named Ajmer State, on 26 January 1950 within Republic of India. Class "C" States were under direct rule of Central Government.

Dissolution
In 1956, when India's state boundaries were reorganised, it became a district of the then Rajasthan state. Ajmer state was merged into Rajasthan state on 1 November 1956. Kishangarh sub-division of erstwhile Jaipur district was added to it to form Ajmer district.

Chief Commissioners
Shankar Prasada, became its first Chief Commissioner from 1947 to 1948
Chandrakant Balwantrao Nagarkar was Chief Commissioner from 1948 to 1951
Anand Dattahaya Pandit, Chief Commissioner from 1952 to March 1954
Moti K. Kripalani, Chief Commissioner from March 1954 to 31 October 1956

Chief Minister
Haribhau Upadhyaya was the first and last Chief Minister of Ajmer State from 24 March 1952 until 1956.

See also
1951 Ajmer Legislative Assembly election
History of Ajmer

References

Political integration of India
States and territories established in 1947
States and territories disestablished in 1956
States and territories established in 1950
History of Rajasthan (1947–present)
History of Ajmer
Former states and territories of India